JC Niala is a writer, poet and storyteller. Works include the play The Strong Room shortlisted by Wole Soyinka in BBC Africa Performance 2010, the film Wazi?FM Winner Best Feature Film Zanzibar International Film Festival 2015, the 2013 film Something Necessary and the play Unsettled

Education and career
Niala is an Honorary Research Fellow at the University of Warwick. She is also a DPhil student at St Catherine's College, Oxford. Her work aims to empower women. She was a researcher and producer for the Women in Oxford's History Podcast Series. Her article "Why African Babies Don't Cry", an African perspective, has been translated into more than 20 languages and has been used as a training tool by La Leche League and The World Alliance for Breast Feeding. Her parenting articles have been used as resources in a number of books.

Niala's work has been staged at The Africa Centre, London, at the Tate Modern and to celebrate World Theatre Day in New York City. She performs stories in different countries including at the Hay Festival, in Kenya and the UK. Her films have been shown at film festivals around the world including Toronto International Film Festival, Zanzibar International Film Festival, Rotterdam Film Festival among others. When she was 17 she filmed, by herself a documentary entitled In and Out of Africa that was aired in 1993 on BBC 2 as part of their Teenage Diaries Series. Her diaries were aired on BBC Radio 4 as part of the series Messages to Myself, where she was the youngest participant in the programme.

Degrees 
 BSc in Psychology from University of Sheffield 
 BSc in Osteopathic Medicine from British College of Osteopathic Medicine 
 MSt in Creative Writing from Kellogg College, University of Oxford

Works 
 2010: The Strong Room (writer)
 2011: A Kenyan Christmas (writer)
 2012: Cows are too Big to Eat (editor)
 2012: Why the Cheetah Hunts at Night (writer)
 2013: Something Necessary (co-writer)
 2014: Baby Elephant Safari (writer)
 2014: Beyond Motherhood: A Guide to Being a Great Working Mother while Living Your Dream (writer)
 2015: Wazi? FM (screenwriter)
 2016: A Wordly War: Battle Experiences through the Eyes of African Cultures (writer/producer)
 2017: A Candid Handbook For Women Doing Business In Kenya (co-writer)
 2019: Unsettled (writer)

Awards 
 2010: BBC Africa Performance - Shortlist
 2015: Zanzibar International Film Festival - Best Feature Film
 2015: European African Film Festivals Award - Best African Film
 2016: The Oxford Research Centre for the Humanities, University of Oxford - WWI Research Competition - First runner-up
 2017: Kellogg College Community Engagement and Academic Merit Award

References 

Kenyan poets
Kenyan women poets
Alumni of Kellogg College, Oxford